Sir Roland Wilson  (7 April 190425 October 1996) was a senior Australian public servant and economist.

Life and career
Wilson was born in Ulverstone, Tasmania on 7 April 1904. He studied at Devonport High School, where he won a scholarship to take an economics course at the University of Tasmania. He became a Rhodes Scholar in 1925, the first Tasmanian from a state school to win the scholarship. The Rhodes Scholarship took him to the University of Oxford where he studied for the degree of doctor of philosophy.

Wilson became Commonwealth Statistician in 1936.

Wilson was appointed Secretary of the Department of Labour and National Service as a war-time secondment in 1940.

In 1946, after World War II, Wilson resumed his position as Commonwealth Statistician until the Menzies Government made him Secretary of the Department of the Treasury in 1951.

On leaving Treasury in 1966, Wilson was the Chairman of Qantas until 1972, and the Chairman of the Commonwealth Bank until 1975.

Awards and honours
He was appointed a Commander of the Order of the British Empire (CBE) in 1941 and knighted in 1955.

The Sir Roland Wilson Building at the Australian National University is named after Wilson, in recognition of his significant contribution to public policy and administration in Australia and in many international forums.

References

1904 births
1996 deaths
Australian Commanders of the Order of the British Empire
Australian Knights Bachelor
Australian statisticians
People from Ulverstone, Tasmania
Secretaries of the Department of the Treasury of Australia
20th-century Australian mathematicians
Australian Rhodes Scholars
Commonwealth Bank people